Schoenus is an ancient measure of distance.

Schoenus may refer to:

Schoenus (Arcadia), a town of ancient Arcadia
Schoenus (Boeotia), a town of ancient Boeotia
Schoenus (Corinthia), a town of ancient Corinthia
Schoenus (mythology), various figures in Greek mythology
Schoenus (plant), a genus of sedges